Arniston was an East Indiaman that made eight voyages for the British East India Company (EIC). She was wrecked on 30 May 1815 during a storm at Waenhuiskrans, near Cape Agulhas, South Africa, with the loss of 372 lives – only six on board survived. She had been chartered as a troopship and was underway from Ceylon to England on a journey to repatriate wounded soldiers from the Kandyan Wars.

Controversially, the ship did not have a marine chronometer on board, a comparatively new navigational instrument that was an "easy and cheap addition to her equipment" that would have enabled her to determine her longitude accurately. Instead, she was forced to navigate through the heavy storm and strong currents using older, less reliable navigational aids and dead reckoning. Navigational difficulties and a lack of headway led to an incorrect assumption that Cape Agulhas was Cape Point. Consequently, Arniston was wrecked when her captain headed north for St Helena, operating on  the incorrect belief the ship had already passed Cape Point.

Overview
East Indiamen operated under charter or licence to the Honourable East India Company, which held a monopoly granted by Queen Elizabeth I of England for all English trade between the Cape of Good Hope and Cape Horn. Arniston was built by William Barnard at Barnard's Thames Yard at Deptford on the Thames and launched in 1794.Mitchell 2007, tertiary sources. She was probably named after Lord Arniston rather than the tiny village of Arniston near Edinburgh.

Arniston was heavily armed, with her fifty-eight guns making her the equivalent of a Royal Navy fourth-rate ship of the line. A classification of "ship of the line" – a class of ship that later evolved into the battleship – meant that a ship was powerful enough to stand in a line of battle and explained why these ships of commerce were sometimes mistaken for men-o-war. The armament was necessary for the ship to protect herself and her valuable cargo from pirates and commerce raiders of other nations during long voyages between Europe and the Far East. Arniston, like other East Indiamen, was slow and unmanoeuvrable, but able to carry a large quantity of cargo.

Voyages (1794–1812)

For her first five voyages she sailed under the ownership and management of John Wedderburn (probably John Wedderburn of Ballindean) and the next three EIC voyages under ownership of Robert Hudson.

Arniston sailed from Great Britain to the Far East eight times before her last voyage.BL 1812, primary sources. She did not suffer any ill effects as a result of this incident however, which is mentioned in journals of the time only for its noteworthiness as a navigation hazard to other shipping.

Apart from this and another incident in 1800, Arnistons first eight voyages were uneventful.

Voyage number 1: St Helena, Madras, and China (1795–1797)
Captain Campbell Marjoribanks:
 3 April 1795: Portsmouth 
 14 April: Tenerife
 2 June: St Helena
 9 August: Cape of Good Hope
 27 September: Madras
 14 November: Penang
 3 December: Malacca
 11 March 1796: Whampoa
 23 April: Second Bar
 29 June: Macau
 20 November: St Helena
 1 March 1797: Deptford

While Arniston was at St Helena on her outward journey, she undertook to transport troops from there to join Lord Elphinstone, who was undertaking an expedition to capture Cape Colony from the Dutch. Vancouver was returning to England after his four-and-a-half-year long voyage of exploration. He transferred to Arniston four field guns that he had been carrying, together with what ammunition he had left for them, for onward transmission to Elphinstone. Discoverys boats also helped in the ferrying of troops from shore to Arniston.

Arniston was to ferry nine field pieces, as well as a company of artillery and three of infantry (393 men in all), to Elphinstone.

Voyage number 2: China (1797–1798)
On this voyage Arniston sailed under a letter of marque in the name of Captain William Macnamara, and dated 13 May 1797. Her itinerary was:
 5 June 1797: Portsmouth
 29 August: Cape of Good Hope
 9 December: Whampoa
 14 February 1798: Second Bar
 26 March: Macau
 5 August: St Helena
 23 October: Long Reach

Voyage number 3: St Helena, Benkulen, and China (1800–1801)
On this voyage Arniston sailed under a letter of marque in the name of Captain Campbell Marjoribanks, and dated 29 November 1799. Her itinerary was:
 7 January 1800: Portsmouth
 4 April: St Helena
 27 June: Benkulen
 29 July: Penang
 27 August: Malacca
 21 September: Whampoa
 29 November: Second Bar
 18 January 1801: Macau
 15 April: St Helena
 17 June: Long Reach

During this voyage Arniston had just anchored at Benkulen on 27 June 1800, when the 26-gun French privateer Confiance attacked her. Arniston cut her anchor and gave chase, firing several broadsides into the other ship, but the faster French ship was able to make an escape.Lindsay 1874, primary sources. On 9 October 1800, the East Indiaman Kent would be less fortunate; Confiance would capture Kent after a two-hour engagement.

Voyage number 4: St Helena, Benkulen, and China (1801–1803)
Captain Campbell Marjoribanks:
 31 December 1801: Downs
 9 March 1802: St Helena
 10 June: Benkulen
 12 July: Penang
 31 August: Whampoa
 24 October: Second Bar
 11 February 1803: St Helena
 26 April: Long Reach

Voyage number 5: China (1804–1805)
On this voyage Arniston sailed under a letter of marque in the name of Captain James Jameson, and dated 24 March 1804. Her itinerary was:

On 9 June 1804, Arniston left St. Helens, Isle of Wight, as part of a convoy of nine East Indiamen of the British East India Company, all bound for China.

The fleet arrived at Rio de Janeiro around 14–18 August. It then passed the Cape of Good Hope. From here, rather than passing through the Indian Ocean and the Straits of Malacca, the fleet sailed south of Western Australia and through Bass Strait. The objectives were two-fold: to avoid French ships reported to be in the Indian Ocean, and to improve the charting of Bass Strait.

The ships then sailed to Norfolk Island, which was the next rendezvous point after Saint Paul Island, for members that had separated. Taunton Castle had separated in the South Atlantic and although she arrived at Norfolk Island three days after the fleet had sailed on, did not rejoin the rest of the fleet until she arrived at Haerlem Bay, in China.

The arrival of Athenienne and the East Indiamen at Norfolk Island sowed panic among the colonists there who feared that a French flotilla had arrived.

The fleet arrived at Whampoa in mid-January 1805. The fleet then returned to England via the Straits of Malacca. Arniston, for example, crossed the second Bar on 14 February, reached Malacca on 21 March and St Helena on 30 June, and arrived at Long Reach on 15 September.

Voyage number 6: China (1806–1807)
On this voyage Arniston sailed under a letter of marque in the name of Captain Peter Wedderburn dated 20 March 1806. Her itinerary was:
 14 May 1806: Portsmouth
 7 August: Cape of Good Hope
 10 October: Penang
 21 January 1807: Whampoa
 4 May: off Lintin Island
 1 July: Penang
 17 July: Acheh
 19 September: Cape of Good Hope
 13 October: St Helena
 6 January 1808: Lower Hope

Voyage number 7: Bombay and China (1810–1811)
Captain Samuel Landon:
 21 January 1810: Portsmouth
 9 April: Cape of Good Hope
 26 May: Bombay
 1 September: Penang
 12 October: Whampoa
 29 December: Second Bar
 28 May 1811: St Helena
 13 August: Long Reach

Voyage number 8: Bombay and China (1812–1813)
On this voyage Arniston sailed under a letter of marque in the name of Captain Walter Campbell. Her itinerary was:
 4 January 1812: Torbay
 5 April: Johanna
 7 May: Bombay
 11 September: Whampoa
 4 January 1813: Macau
 27 March: St Helena
 7 June: Long Reach

The British government then chartered Arniston as a troop transport to the Cape and India.

Voyage number 9: Madeira, Cape, and Ceylon (1814–1815)
Captain George Simpson left England on 8 June 1814. At Ceylon, Arniston embarked soldiers of the 73rd Regiment, who were wounded in the Kandyan Wars in Ceylon, to repatriate them to England.

Wreck (1815)

Critically, the ship did not have a chronometer—a comparatively new navigational instrument that was an "easy and cheap addition to her equipment" at the time—for this voyage. Captain George Simpson could not afford the 60–100 guineas for one,Hall 1820, primary sources. and the ship's owners were also unwilling to purchase one, even threatening to replace him with another captain if he refused to set sail without one.Hall 1833, primary sources.

Among her 378 passengers were many invalid soldiers and sailors, plus 14 women and 25 children.

During the passage from Ceylon, at one o'clock every day, the ships signalled each other their longitude that they calculated using their chronometers. In this way, the ships were able to compare their respective instruments, and the master of the Arniston was able to learn his longitude too, as long as he remained in the convoy.

On 26 May, while rounding the southern tip of Africa, Arniston separated from the convoy in bad weather after her sails were damaged. Without accurate daily longitudinal information from the other ships, Arniston had to rely instead on older, less accurate navigation methods. Navigation via dead reckoning proved particularly difficult as there were strong ocean currents combined with inclement weather that prevented a fix being obtained for several days via celestial navigation.

On 29 May, land was sighted to the north at 7 am, and given the dead reckoning estimates, was presumed to be the Cape of Good Hope. The ship sailed west until 4:30 pm on 29 May, then turned north to run for St Helena. However the land sighted had in fact been Cape Agulhas (then known as "Cape L'Agullas") and the ship had also not made good headway against the current since this sighting. Compounding these navigational errors, the master had not taken any depth soundings (which would have confirmed his location over the Agulhas Bank), before heading north. The anchors were unable to hold the heavy ship in the storm, so on 30 May near 4 pm, Lieutenant Brice advised Captain Simpson to ground the ship to save the lives of those aboard. Eight minutes later, at about 8 pm, the ship struck rocks half a mile offshore and heeled into the wind. The guns on the opposite side were cut away in a failed attempt to level the ship, which soon started to break up in the waves.AJ 1816, primary sources.

Only six men (the ship's carpenter and five sailors of the 378 people on board survived, after reaching the shore only with great difficulty through the high surf. The following morning the sternpost was the only part of the vessel still visible. The ship and her passengers had been lost for lack of a chronometer, or as an officer from the same convoy later wrote:

Aftermath

The six survivors buried the bodies found on the beach, then travelled east along the beach, expecting to reach Cape Town. However, after four and a half days, they realised their error and returned to the site of the wreck. Here they subsisted off a cask of oatmeal, while trying to effect repairs to the ship's pinnace, which had been washed ashore. They were discovered six days later on 14 June by a farmer's son, who was out hunting.
 Among the victims were: Captain George Simpson, Lieutenant Brice, 6th Viscount Lord and Lady Molesworth.
 The six survivors were: Dr. Gunter (boatswain), John Barrett (carpenter), Charles Stewart Scott (carpenter's mate), William Grung (second class), Gibbs (third class), Robinson (fourth class).

A memorial, a replica of which can be seen today, was erected on the beach by the wife of Colonel Andrew Geils (spelled "Giels" in this instance), whose four children were lost in the tragedy on their homeward journey, having visited him in Ceylon. The memorial bears the following inscription:

Over time, the seaside village of Waenhuiskrans has become so associated with the wreck, that it now is also known as Arniston.  The nearby town of Bredasdorp has a museum dedicated to the wreck. The wreck had a direct influence on the decision to build a lighthouse at Cape Agulhas to the west in 1847–1848.Proposals for a Lighthouse at L'Agulhas, secondary sources.

Archaeological excavation
The National Monuments Council issued a permit to UCT student Jim Jobling to conduct an underwater survey of the site, as well as a limited excavation. A number of artefacts were recovered, which were donated to the Bredasdorp Shipwreck Museum.

Notes, citations, and references

Notes

Citations

References
 Primary sources consulted 

 
 
 Hackman, Rowan (2001) Ships of the East India Company. (Gravesend, Kent: World Ship Society). 
  – The Arniston cautionary tale (concluding an exposé of dead reckoning with a map p. 276).
  – Chapter reprinted from his Fragments of Voyages and Travels, 3rd series (1833).
 Hardy, Charles (1835) Supplement to a Register of Ships Employed in the Service of the ... East India Company from 1760 to the Conclusion of the Commercial Charter, Etc.
 
 
 
 
 
 Vancouver, George (1798) A voyage of discovery to the North Pacific Ocean and round the world. (London: G.G. and J. Robinson).

 Secondary sources consulted 

 
  (A partnership of websites with material from the heritage organisations of the five key maritime cities in the UK – Bristol, Hartlepool, Liverpool, London and Southampton)

 Tertiary sources consulted 

  – Citing : Wexham, Brian. Shipwrecks of the Western Cape. And: Turner, Malcolm. Shipwrecks and Salvage in South Africa.

External links
 
 The history of HMS Arniston in connection with the village Arniston

Maritime incidents in 1815
Shipwrecks of the South African Indian Ocean coast
Monuments and memorials in South Africa
Troop ships of the United Kingdom
1815 in South Africa
Ships built in Deptford
Ships of the British East India Company
1794 ships
Maritime incidents in South Africa
Age of Sail merchant ships
Merchant ships of the United Kingdom